James Esmond Bulmer (born 19 May 1935) was a British Conservative Party politician. He is the son of Edward Charles Bulmer (b. 1907) and his wife Margaret Leigh (Roberts) Bulmer (b. 1908). His father a R.A.F Flight Lieutenant was killed in 1941 whilst on active service.

Bulmer was educated at Rugby School and King's College, Cambridge. He was commissioned in the Scots Guards during his national service. He then worked for the family firm, H. P. Bulmer Holdings Ltd. He was Member of Parliament for Kidderminster from February 1974 until the 1983 general election, and for Wyre Forest from 1983 until he stood down at the 1987 general election.

References
Times Guide to the House of Commons, 1983

Cider and More Besides Esmond Bulmer The Memoir Club, 2010

External links 

1935 births
Living people
Conservative Party (UK) MPs for English constituencies
UK MPs 1974
UK MPs 1974–1979
UK MPs 1979–1983
UK MPs 1983–1987
People educated at Rugby School
Alumni of King's College, Cambridge
Scots Guards officers